Lee Jun-hyeok (born March 19, 1972), also known as Lee Joon-hyuk, is a South Korean actor. He is known for his role in the popular television series Love in the Moonlight (2016) for which he won Best Supporting Actor at the 30th KBS Drama Awards.

Filmography

Film

Television series

Television shows

Awards and nominations

Notes

References

External links 
  
 
 
 
 

1972 births
Living people
21st-century South Korean male actors
Male actors from Seoul
South Korean male film actors
South Korean male television actors